Natun Jharobari is a village in Kamrup, situated in north bank of river Brahmaputra .

Transport
Natun Jharobari is accessible through National Highway 31. All major private commercial vehicles ply between Natun Jharobari and nearby towns.

See also
 Paneri
 Nartap

References

Villages in Kamrup district